The Northern Continent may refer to:

North America.
Europe, especially Scandinavia.
Asia, specifically Siberia.